Top-seeds and defending champions Gail Chanfreau and Julie Heldman made the final but lost to Fiorella Bonicelli and Isabel Fernández, who won $3,500 for their efforts.

Seeds
A champion seed is indicated in bold text while text in italics indicates the round in which that seed was eliminated.

 Gail Chanfreau /  Julie Heldman (final)
N/A
 Fiorella Bonicelli /  Isabel Fernández (champions)
N/A

Draw

Finals

References

U.S. Clay Court Championships
1975 U.S. Clay Court Championships